Dalian American International School (DAIS) is an American international school in the Golden Pebble Beach National Resort, in Jinzhou New District, Dalian, China, about  east of the center of Dalian. It is owned by the Honor Roll Company.
DAIS is associated with the Association of China and Mongolia International Schools (ACAMIS). The member schools include Shanghai American School, British International School, The International School of Macao, International School of Beijing, and Dulwich College.

The American international school program, serving grades Pre-Kindergarten to 12, admits pupils who are not Mainland Chinese citizens. Mainland Chinese are instead admitted to the Huamei Academy, a 7-12 grade program.

DAIS also administers a Montessori-style preschool on campus; this preschool is administratively separate from DAIS.

History
Honor Roll established DAIS in 2006 after Intel asked for an American schooling option for children of its employees; Intel had started operations in the Dalian area that year.

Student body
As of 2022, the international division of DAIS has shrunken to the size of a pea. There are a barely any students from outside of China. Students from Germany, Korea, Russia, U.S., India, Canada, the Philippines and Japan have all left. Meanwhile the Chinese students are a majority. This year (2021-2022), the Huamei Academy had around 400 Chinese national students. In regards to the employers of the students' parents and guardians, students at the school who have one or more parents/guardians working for Intel make up some of the group. However after Covid severely impacted Dalian, those Intel families have left to reside back in America.  The language needs of the student body is Chinese. Almost none speak english.

See also
Americans in China

References

External links
 Dalian American International School
 Huamei Academy
  Huamei Academy

Schools in Dalian
American international schools in China